James W. Neely (born 1951) is an American politician and physician who served as a member of the Missouri House of Representatives from 2012 to 2021. He is also the long-term care medical director of the Cameron Regional Medical Center.

Early life and education 
After graduating from Grandview High School in 1969, Neely enrolled in the Army ROTC program at the University of Missouri where he graduated with a Bachelor's degree in business administration. After served as an officer in the United States Army, Neely graduated with a Doctor of Osteopathic Medicine degree from the University of Health Sciences College of Medicine in Kansas City.

Career 
Neely previously served on the Cameron School Board from 1995 to 2005. A member of the Republican Party, he was elected to the Missouri House of Representatives in 2012.

2020 Missouri gubernatorial election 

He was a candidate for the Republican nomination for governor of Missouri in 2020. Among his primary reasons behind running for governor were a discontent with how state government is being run, and a desire to help resolve issues in education, healthcare, and criminal reform. Neely placed third in the Republican primary in a field of four candidates.

Electoral history

State Representative

Governor

References

Living people
1950s births
Republican Party members of the Missouri House of Representatives
Place of birth missing (living people)
University of Missouri alumni
21st-century American politicians
American osteopathic physicians
Candidates in the 2020 United States elections